Bourhane Hamidou is a politician from Comoros who served as President and Speaker of the Assembly of Comoros. He was the candidate for 2016 Comorian presidential election in which he got 6,397 votes. He is the supporter of Sun Party of Comoros. In March 2015, he resigned as Speaker. He also served as Minister of Interior and Information.

References 

Comorian politicians
Speakers of the Assembly of the Union of the Comoros
21st-century Comorian politicians
Year of birth missing (living people)
Living people